Robert S. McKelvey was an American football player and coach.  He served as the head football coach at Boston University for the 1945 season, compiling a record of 0–5.

Head coaching record

References

Year of birth missing
Year of death missing
Boston University Terriers football coaches
Villanova Wildcats football players